Stob a'Choin (869 m) is a mountain in the Grampian Mountains, Scotland, north of Loch Katrine in the Loch Lomond and The Trossachs National Park.

The nearest village is Balquhidder.

References

Mountains and hills of Stirling (council area)
Marilyns of Scotland
Corbetts
Mountains and hills of the Southern Highlands